Sigmund Hågvar (born 2 September 1944) is a Norwegian entomologist and environmentalist.

He finished his secondary education at Valler in 1963. He became a professor of nature conservation at the Norwegian University of Life Sciences.

Hågvar chaired the Norwegian Entomological Society from 1991 to 1995. In 2006 he became a fellow of the Royal Swedish Academy of Agriculture and Forestry. He has also had insects named after him, namely Syntemna haagvari and Vertagopus haagvari.

He resides at Nordstrand.

References

1944 births
Living people
Norwegian entomologists
Academic staff of the Norwegian University of Life Sciences
Norwegian environmentalists
Members of the Royal Swedish Academy of Agriculture and Forestry